The Minnesota Intercollegiate Athletic Conference (MIAC) is a college athletic conference which competes in NCAA Division III. All 13 of the member schools are located in Minnesota and are private institutions, with only two being non-sectarian.

History

On March 15, 1920, a formal constitution was adopted and the Minnesota Intercollegiate Athletic Conference with founding members Carleton College, Gustavus Adolphus College, Hamline University, Macalester College, Saint John's University, St. Olaf College, and the College of St. Thomas (now University of St. Thomas).

Concordia College joined the MIAC in 1921, Augsburg University in 1924, and Saint Mary's University in 1926.  Carleton dropped membership in 1925, rejoining in 1983. St. Olaf left in 1950, returning in 1975. The University of Minnesota Duluth was a member of the MIAC from 1950 to 1975.  Bethel University joined in 1978. The MIAC initiated women's competition in the 1981–82 season.  Two all-women's schools subsequently joined the conference, St. Catherine University in 1983 and the College of St. Benedict in 1985.

The conference did not play sports from the fall 1943 to the spring of 1945 due to World War II. Saint Mary's discontinued its football program in 1955. Macalester football left the conference in 2002, but subsequently rejoined. St. Catherine and St. Benedict, being both women's colleges, also do not sponsor football. Together with Saint John's, one of only a handful of men's colleges, St. Benedict forms a joint academic institution, known commonly by the initialism CSB/SJU.

From 1947 to 2003 the MIAC had a strong men's wrestling program, which was discontinued following the 2002–03 season. The strongest teams over the history of the conference were Augsburg with 31 team championships, and Saint John's with 14 team championships. The MIAC teams and individual wrestlers demonstrated a strong national and Olympic presence in the 1970s and beyond.

On May 22, 2019, it was announced that the MIAC had expelled the University of St. Thomas effective at the end of spring 2021 at the latest, giving it time to make other athletic arrangements were that much time to become necessary.  St. Thomas by this point had over twice the enrollment of any other member institution. and on May 28, 2020, the conference announced the addition of the College of St. Scholastica after leaving the Upper Midwest Athletic Conference in 2021.

The conference split into two divisions for football in 2021. The Northwoods Division consists of Carleton College, Gustavus Adolphus College, Saint John's University, St. Olaf College, and The College of St. Scholastica. The Skyline Division consists of Augsburg University, Bethel University, Concordia College, Hamline University, and Macalester College.

Chronological timeline
 1920 - On March 15, 1920, the Minnesota Intercollegiate Athletic Conference (MIAC) was founded. Charter members included Carleton College, Gustavus Adolphus College, Hamline University, Macalester College, Saint John's University, St. Olaf College and the College of St. Thomas (now the University of St. Thomas) beginning the 1920-21 academic year.
 1921 - Concordia College at Moorhead joined the MIAC in the 1921-22 academic year.
 1924 - Augsburg Seminary (now Augsburg University) joined the MIAC in the 1924-25 academic year.
 1925 - Carleton left the MIAC after the 1924-25 academic year.
 1926 - Saint Mary's College (now Saint Mary's University) joined the MIAC in the 1926-27 academic year.
 1950 - St. Olaf left the MIAC to become an Independent (who would later join the Midwest Collegiate Athletic Conference (MCAC) beginning the 1952-53 academic year) after the 1949-50 academic year.
 1951 - The University of Minnesota at Duluth joined the MIAC in the 1951-52 academic year.
 1974 - St. Olaf re-joined the MIAC in the 1974-75 academic year.
 1975 - Minnesota–Duluth left the MIAC to join the Northern Intercollegiate Conference (NIC) after the 1974-75 academic year.
 1977 - Bethel College and Seminary (now Bethel University) joined the MIAC in the 1977-78 academic year.
 1982 – The MIAC became exclusively an NCAA Division III athletic conference, forgoing its membership in the National Association of Intercollegiate Athletics (NAIA).
 1983 - St. Catherine University joined the MIAC (with Carleton re-joining) in the 1983-84 academic year.
 1985 - The College of Saint Benedict joined the MIAC in the 1985-86 academic year.
 2021
 St. Thomas left the MIAC to join the NCAA Division I ranks and the Summit League after the 2020-21 academic year.
 The College of St. Scholastica joined the MIAC in the 2021-22 academic year.

Member schools

Current members
The MIAC currently has 13 full members, all private schools.

Notes

Former members

Notes

Membership timeline

Sports

Member teams compete in 22 sports, 11 men's and 11 women's.

Men's sports
baseball
basketball
cross country
football 
golf
ice hockey
indoor track and field
soccer
swimming and diving
tennis
track and field

Women's sports
basketball
cross country
golf
ice hockey
indoor track and field
soccer
softball
swimming and diving
tennis
track and field
volleyball

The conference no longer sponsors wrestling or men's and women's Nordic skiing.

Rivalry trophies
Football
 The Goat (Carleton v. St. Olaf) founded 1931
 The Old Paint Bucket (Macalester v. Hamline) founded 1965
 The Troll (Concordia v. St. Olaf) founded 1974
 The Book of Knowledge (Carleton v. Macalester) founded 1998

 The Hammer (Augsburg v. Hamline) founded 2005

Other sports
The Goat (Carleton and St. Olaf, men's basketball) founded 1913
The Karhu Shoe (Carleton v. St. Olaf, men's and women's cross country) founded 1972
The Margate Memorial Trophy (Carleton v. St. Thomas, swimming and diving) founded 1995
The Presidents Cup (Carleton v. St. Olaf, women's basketball) founded 2001
The Rolex (Carleton v. St. Olaf, men's track and field)
The Rusty Putter (Carleton v. St. Olaf, men's golf)

Defunct
 The Power Bowl (Concordia v. Minnesota State University-Moorhead, football) founded 1984, through 1998 as the American Crystal Sugar Bowl, from 1999–2007 as the Power Bowl
 The Holy Grail (Saint John's v. St. Thomas) founded 2001, became defunct after the 2019 game, after which St. Thomas moved to Division I.

Source:

All-Sports Trophy
The All-Sports Trophy is given to the school with the best overall record for all MIAC sports in each gender. The men's trophy was first awarded for 1962-63 to Macalester College. St. Olaf College received the first women's trophy in 1983-84. The University of St. Thomas won both the men's and women's trophies from 2008 to 2017. The men's is named the George Durenberger Trophy and the women's is named the Pat Wiesner Trophy Not awarded 2019-20 and 2020-21 due to Covid pandemic.

Football

Conference titles

c = Co-champions
No 1943 and 1944 seasons due to World War II.
No 2020 season due to COVID-19.
Source:

Soccer

Men's soccer regular season conference titles

c = Co-champions
No championship awarded for 2020 due to Covid pandemic
Source:

Women's soccer regular season conference titles

c = Co-champions
No championship awarded for 2020 due to Covid pandemic
Source:

Basketball

Men's basketball regular season conference titles

c = Co-champions
No 1943–44 and 1944–45 seasons due to World War II.
No championship awarded for 2020-21 due to Covid pandemic.
Source:

Women's basketball regular season conference titles

c = Co-champions
No championship awarded for 2021 due to Covid pandemic
Source:

Ice hockey

Men's ice hockey regular season conference titles

c = Co-champions
No seasons from 1942–43 to 1945–46.
No championship awarded for 2020-21 due to Covid pandemic.
Source:

Men's ice hockey conference tournament

Women's ice hockey regular season conference titles

c = Co-champions
No championship awarded for 2021 due to Covid pandemic
Source:

Women's ice hockey conference tournament

Facilities

Commissioner
The executive director, a position that was created in 1994, serves as the conference commissioner.
 Carlyle Carter (1994–2005)
 Daniel McKane (2005–present)

References

External links
 
 MIAC First 50 Years

 
College sports in Minnesota
Private and independent school organizations